Eyeopener are a British dance group active since 2003. Their first hit, a cover of Eric Carmen's "Hungry Eyes", reached No. 16 on the UK Singles Chart and No.7 on the Scottish Singles Chart. Their song "Sexy Eyes" was included in the compilation album, Clubland 7.

Discography

Singles
 "Open Your Eyes" (2003)
 "Hungry Eyes" (2004) - UK No. 16
 "Sexy Eyes" (2005)
 "Angel Eyes" (2005)
 "She's Like the Wind" (2007)
 "Singin' Dam Di Da Doo" (2008)
 "Will My Heart Survive"

References

External links
Discography @ Discogs.com

British trance music groups
Musical groups from Manchester
British musical trios
English dance music groups